is a Japanese actress. Debuting on film in 1964, she won the Blue Ribbon Award for best new face for Nihiki no mesuinu. Beyond appearing in over fifty Japanese language films in the 1960s and 1970s, she has also acted extensively on stage, winning major awards such as the Kinokuniya Theatre Prize. She is married to Renji Ishibashi.

Films
Blind Beast
Kunoichi Keshō (1964)
Three Resurrected Drunkards (1968)

Television
Daitsuiseki
Tantei Monogatari (episode 1)
Playgirl
Monkey as the Locust Queen in episode "Land for the Locusts"

References

External links

Goo Eiga

Japanese actresses
1944 births
Living people